The first series of Comedy Playhouse, that continued to be a long-running BBC series, broadcast from 15 December 1961 to 16 February 1962. All the episodes were written by Ray Galton and Alan Simpson.

Background
The first series, which was in black and white, consisted of ten episodes, each of which had a different cast and storyline. Only the fourth episode, The Offer, made it to its own series becoming Steptoe and Son; all other episodes of this series of Comedy Playhouse are lost. The episodes were broadcast on Friday at 8:45pm, except for The Status Symbol, which was broadcast at 8:40pm.

Episodes

References

Mark Lewisohn, "Radio Times Guide to TV Comedy", BBC Worldwide Ltd, 2003
British TV Comedy Guide for Comedy Playhouse

Comedy Playhouse (series 1)